Javiera Díaz de Valdés Alemparte (born 30 June 1981 in Santiago), is a Chilean television actress best known for her role in the telenovela "Gatas y Tuercas". Javiera is a descendant of Javiera Carrera, a Chilean patriot of Basque descent, married to Spanish Pedro Díaz de Valdés.

She was a model for the Elite modeling agency. As an actress she debuted in the film Sexo con Amor. In 2005 participated in the telenovela "Gatas y Tuercas", "Charly Tango" in 2006 and recently "Mujeres de Lujo" in 2009–2010.

Personal life
In 2006, Javiera Díaz de Valdés married the poet and television presenter Pablo Mackenna and in 2008 born their first child, Rosa. During 2009, they ended their relationship.

Filmography

Films

Telenovela

References

External links
 

1981 births
Actresses from Santiago
Chilean female models
Chilean film actresses
Chilean television actresses
Chilean telenovela actresses
Chilean people of Basque descent
Chilean people of Spanish descent
Living people
21st-century Chilean women